The Québec men's provincial floorball team is the men's provincial floorball team of Québec, and a member of Floorball Canada. Québec's men's team is currently ranked 2nd in Canada at floorball, based on their performance at the 2010 Canadian Floorball Championships.

Québec maintains a strong rivalry in floorball with Ontario. The team is organized by Floorball Québec and is sponsored by Scanadian Floorball.

Team Roster

Canadian Nationals

Floorball
Canadian floorball teams
Floorball